Tim Cranston (born 13 December 1962) is a retired professional ice hockey player who holds dual Canadian and British nationality. He played in Europe between 1985 and 1999 except for one game in the 1986–87 season played in the American Hockey League. He was also a member of the Great Britain national ice hockey team between 1993 and 1997. Whilst living in the United Kingdom, Cranston was the founding chairman of the British Ice Hockey Player's Association (GB). Currently living in Halifax, Nova Scotia, Cranston is working as a sports agent and lawyer for the sports and entertainment industries. He was inducted into the British Ice Hockey Hall of Fame in 2010.

Playing career
After playing junior ice hockey, Cranston moved to Europe to play for GIJS Groningen in the 1984–85 season of the Dutch Eredivisie. He then split the 1985–86 season between VEU Feldkirch in the Austrian Hockey League and Genève-Servette HC in the Swiss Nationalliga B. During the 1986–87 season, he again played in the Nationalliga B, but this time with EHC Basel, as well as playing for EV Füssen in the German 1.Liga Süd before he finished the season playing one game for Nova Scotia Oilers in the American Hockey League.

Cranston returned to Europe and the Swiss Nationalliga B for the 1987–88 season to play for SC Herisau. He again split the 1988–89 season when he played for EV Duisburg in the German 1.Liga Nord and the Fife Flyers in the Premier Division of the British Hockey League (BHL). Remaining in the United Kingdom, Cranston then joined the Cleveland Bombers in Division 1 of the BHL for the 1989–90 season. A successful season saw Cranston named to the All Star team and promotion for Cleveland to the Premier Division. Cranston again played for Cleveland during the 1990–91 season before he moved to the Durham Wasps for the 1991–92 and 1992–93 seasons. During the 1991–92 season with Durham, he helped them to win the league championship and the playoffs.

Joining the Sheffield Steelers for the 1993–94 season, Cranston remained in Sheffield for the next five seasons. A successful period for both Cranston and Sheffield, he helped them to win the league championship and the playoffs in the 1994–95 season, a Grand Slam of the Benson & Hedges Cup, the league championship and the playoffs in the 1995–96 season, and the playoffs in the inaugural season of the Ice Hockey Superleague, 1996–97.

Cranston played his final season with the Edinburgh Capitals in the British National League during the 1998–99 season.

Off ice career
With ice hockey in the United Kingdom becoming more popular in the late 1980s and the influx of player's, Cranston, with Joanne Collins, formed the Ice Hockey Player's Association (GB) in 1994. He was the founding chairman and has remained the Association's legal adviser.

During his time at Sheffield, Cranston married his English girlfriend, Anna, and he attended the University of Sheffield and obtained a law degree. He also opened a sports bar, The Player's Cafe, with Sheffield rock band, Def Leppard, members Joe Elliott and Rick Savage.

Returning to North America in 1999 when he retired from playing, Cranston became a sports agent and formed his own company, Cranston Sports Management, with whom he has represented or trained such players as Sidney Crosby and Marek Svatos. He has also continued to work as a lawyer in the sports and entertainment industries.

Cranston was a candidate in the 2021 Nova Scotia general election in the Halifax Atlantic riding for the Progressive Conservative Party of Nova Scotia. He was not elected.

Honours and awards
Named to the BHL Division 1 All Star Team in 1990.
Awarded testimonial by Sheffield Steelers on 4 November 1998.
Number 4 jersey retired by Sheffield Steelers.
Inducted to the Sheffield Steelers Hall of Fame in 2005.
Inducted to the British Ice Hockey Hall of Fame in 2010.

Records
Most assists (67) and points (113) for Sherbrooke Beavers in 1980–81.
Most points (133) in the Dutch Eredivisie in 1984–85.
Most penalty minutes (78) for the Cleveland Bombers in 1989–90.
Most goals (71), assists (47) and points (118) for the Cleveland Bombers in 1990–91.
Most goals (69) and points (132) for the Sheffield Steelers in 1993–94.
Most penalty minutes (126) for Sheffield Steelers in 1994–95.

Career statistics

International play
Played for the Great Britain national ice hockey team in:
1993 Pool B World Championships
1993 Olympic Qualifying Tournament
1994 World Championships
1995 Olympic Qualifying Tournament
1996 Pool B World Championships
1996 Olympic Qualifying Tournament
1997 Pool B World Championships

International statistics

Footnotes

References
A to Z Encyclopaedia of Ice Hockey
British Ice Hockey Fans Association
European Hockey.Net
Ice Hockey Journalists UK
The Internet Hockey Database
The Sheffield Star
sheffieldsteelers.co.uk
Sheffield Steelers Hall of Fame
Sheffield Steelers! Monthly
The Sunday Mirror

External links

Ice Hockey Player's Association

1962 births
Living people
Alumni of the University of Sheffield
British Ice Hockey Hall of Fame inductees
British ice hockey players
Canadian ice hockey forwards
Candidates in Nova Scotia provincial elections
Cleveland Bombers players
Durham Wasps players
Edinburgh Capitals players
EHC Basel players
EV Füssen players
Fife Flyers players
Füchse Duisburg players
Genève-Servette HC players
GIJS Groningen players
Hull Olympiques players
Ice hockey people from Nova Scotia
Lawyers in Nova Scotia
Murrayfield Racers players
Nova Scotia Oilers players
SC Herisau players
Sportspeople from Halifax, Nova Scotia
Sheffield Steelers players
Sherbrooke Castors players
Canadian sports agents
VEU Feldkirch players
Canadian expatriate ice hockey players in England
Canadian expatriate ice hockey players in Scotland
Canadian expatriate ice hockey players in the Netherlands
Canadian expatriate ice hockey players in Austria
Canadian expatriate ice hockey players in Switzerland
Naturalised citizens of the United Kingdom